This article deals with literature written in Dutch during the 19th century in the Dutch-speaking regions (Netherlands, Belgium, Dutch East Indies).

The last years of the 18th century, which had seen decline in the Republic, including the arts and international politics, were marked by a general revival of intellectual force. The romantic movement in Germany made itself deeply felt in all branches of Dutch literature and German lyricism took the place hitherto held by French classicism, in spite of the country falling to French expansionalism (see also History of the Netherlands).

The French era and the United Kingdom of the Netherlands (1795–1839)
Against this backdrop, the most prominent writer was Willem Bilderdijk (1756–1831), an intellectual and intelligent man whose outspoken and eccentric worldview was partly caused by an illness during his adolescence that kept him indoors for ten years. Once recovered he lived a busy, eventful life, writing great quantities of verse; in 1809 he started writing the work he designed to be his masterpiece, the epic De Ondergang der Eerste Wereld ("The Destruction of the First World"), which remained unfinished and appeared as a fragment only in 1820.

Bilderdijk had no time for the new romantic style of poetry, but its fervour found its way into the Netherlands nevertheless, and first of all in the person of Hiëronymus van Alphen (1746–1803). Van Alphen is best remembered for the verses he wrote for children, which are still taught in kindergartens all over the country. Van Alphen was an exponent of the more sentimental school along with Rhijnvis Feith (1753–1824), whose romances are steeped in Weltschmerz.

In Hendrik Tollens (1780–1856) some the power of Bilderdijk and the sweetness of Feith were combined. He is best known for celebrating the great deeds of Dutch history in a series of lyrical romances. Today, Tollens is best known for his poem "Wien Neêrlands Bloed" ("To Those in Whom Dutch Blood Flows Through the Veins"), a nationalistic effort that, set to music, was the Dutch national anthem until 1932, when it was superseded by Marnix' "Wilhelmus". A poet of considerable talent, whose powers were awakened by personal intercourse with Tollens and his followers, was Antoni Christiaan Wijnandt Staring (1767–1840). Staring first published at the age of fifty-three only, but continued to write till past his seventieth year. His poems are a blend of romanticism and rationalism.

During this period, the Low Countries had gone through major political upheaval. The Spanish Netherlands had first become the Austrian Netherlands before being annexed by France in 1794. The Republic, which had become a de facto monarchy in 1747 when the office of stadtholder became hereditary to the House of Orange-Nassau, saw a revolution inspired and backed by France that led to the Batavian Republic and Kingdom of Holland vassal states before actual French annexation in 1810. This transition period removed many old habits and institutions and provided for unitary government, the first constitution (1798) and uniform orthography (Matthias Siegenbeek's spelling).

After Napoleon's downfall in the Southern Netherlands village of Waterloo, the northern and southern provinces were briefly united as the United Kingdom of the Netherlands; this period lasted until 1830 only, when the southern provinces seceded to form Belgium. This period had little influence in literature, and in the new state of Belgium, the status of the Dutch language remained largely unchanged as all governmental and educational affairs were conducted in French.

Ministers, formalism and romanticism (1830–1880)
In scientific and religious literature men of letters showed themselves cognizant of the newest shades of opinion, and freely ventilated their ideas. The language resisted the pressure of German from the outside, and from within broke through its long stagnation and enriched itself, as a medium for literary expression, with a multitude of fresh and colloquial forms. At the same time, no very great genius arose in the Netherlands in any branch of literature. For the thirty or forty years preceding 1880 the course of literature in Holland was smooth and even sluggish. The Dutch writers had slipped into a conventionality of treatment and a strict limitation of form from which even the most striking talents among them could scarcely escape.

Poetry and a large part of prose was dominated by the so-called school of ministers, as the leading writers all were or had been Calvinist ministers. As a result, many of their products emphasized Biblical and bourgeois domestic values. Prime examples include Everhardus Johannes Potgieter (1808–1875, lyric poetry) and Nicolaas Beets (1814–1903), who wrote large quantities of sermons and poetry under his own name but is chiefly remembered today for the humorous prose sketches of Dutch life in Camera Obscura (1839), which he wrote during his student days under the pseudonym of Hildebrand.

A poet of power and promise was lost in the early death of P.A. de Genestet (1829–1861). His narrative poem "De Sint-Nicolaasavond" ("Eve of Saint Nicholas") appeared in 1849 and attained great popularity. Another poet who among others wrote verse for children was Jan Pieter Heije (1809–1876), whose songs are sung to this day. A poet who left no large contemporary impression but who is considered one of the very few readable 19th-century poets is Piet Paaltjens (ps. of François Haverschmidt, 1835–1894). Paaltjens personifies the pure Romantic vein exemplified in German literature by Heine and others. Criticism was best represented by W. J. A. Jonckbloet (1817–1885), who was the first to write a comprehensive history of Dutch literature (1870).

Under the influence of romantic nationalism, writers in Belgium began to reconsider their Flemish heritage and move for a recognition of the Dutch language in both official affairs (including education) and literature. Charles De Coster laid the foundations for a native Belgian literature by recounting the Flemish past in historic romances but wrote his works, including his masterpiece Légende de Thyl Ulenspiegel et de Lamme Goedzak (1867) in French. Hendrik Conscience (1812–1883), himself the son of a Frenchman, was the first to write about Flemish subjects in the Dutch language and so is considered the father of modern Flemish literature. In Flemish poetry, Guido Gezelle (1830–1899) is an important figure. Gezelle, an ordained journalist-cum-ethnologist, celebrated his faith and his Flemish roots using an archaic vocabulary based on Medieval Flemish dialects to the detriment of his intelligibility beyond his native West Flanders.

After the restoration in 1815 to the Dutch state of the Dutch East Indies, former corporate Dutch East India Company possessions occupied by the United Kingdom during the Napoleonic era, works of literature continued to be produced there, among which the romances of Melati van Java (ps. of Nicolina Maria Christina Sloot, 1853–1927), which were widely read in both the Netherlands and Belgium. With the rise of social consciousness regarding the administration of the colonies and the treatment of their inhabitants, however, a far more influential voice rose from the Indies in the form of Multatuli (ps. of Eduard Douwes Dekker, 1820–1887), whose Max Havelaar (1860) is a scathing indictment of colonial mismanagement and one of the few 19th-century prose works still widely considered readable today. Although the Belgians had obtained colonial possessions in their own right with the Congo Free State/Belgian Congo, no Dutch-language literature was forthcoming as the territory was entirely Francophone.

The two leading Dutch men of letters in the mid-19th century besides Beets and Douwes Dekker were critics, Conrad Busken-Huet (1826–1886) and Carel Vosmaer (1826–1888). In Busken-Huet the principles of the 1830–1880 period were summed up; he had been during all those years the fearless and trusty watch-dog of Dutch letters as he understood them. He lived just long enough to become aware that a revolution was approaching, not to comprehend its character; but his accomplished fidelity to literary principle and his wide knowledge have been honoured even by the most bitter of the younger school.

The Movement of 1880

In November 1881 Jacques Perk (born 1860) died, a young poet who had done no more than publish a few sonnets in a journal published by Vosmaer. He was no sooner dead, however, than his posthumous poems, and in particular a cycle of sonnets called "Mathilde", were published (1882) and awakened extraordinary emotion. Perk had rejected all the formulas of rhetorical poetry, and had broken up the conventional rhythms. There had been no music like his heard in Holland for two hundred years.

A group of young men collected around his name. They were joined by a poet-novelist-dramatist somewhat older than themselves, Marcellus Emants (1848–1923). Emants had written a symbolical poem called "Lilith" in 1879 that had been stigmatised as audacious and meaningless; encouraged by the admiration of his juniors, Emants published in 1881 a treatise in the form of a novel in which the first open attack was made on the old school.

The next appearance was that of Willem Kloos (1857–1938), who had been the editor and intimate friend of Perk, and who now undertook to lead the army of rebellion. His violent attacks on recognized authority in aesthetics began in 1882 and created a considerable scandal. For some time the new poets and critics found a great difficulty in being heard as all the channels of periodical literature were closed to them, but in 1884 the young school founded a review, De Nieuwe Gids ("The New Guide"), which was able to offer a direct challenge to De Gids ("The Guide"), the old guard's periodical. The new movement was called Tachtigers or "Movement of (Eighteen-)Eighty", after the decade in which it arose. The Tachtigers insisted that style must match content, and that intimate and visceral emotions can only be expressed using an intimate and visceral writing style.

In the same year 1884 a new element was introduced. Until now, the influences of the young Dutch poetry had chiefly come from the United Kingdom; they were those of Shelley, Mrs Browning, the Rossettis (Dante and Christina). The French naturalists now became an additional ingredient and for some time the new Dutch literature became a sort of mixture of Shelley and Zola, heady and bewildering. This was the great flowering moment of the new school.

One of the most important Dutch novelists, Louis Couperus (1863–1923), had his roots in the Tachtigers movement. His boyhood years were spent in Java, and he had preserved in all his nature a certain tropical magnificence. His first literary efforts were lyrics in the Tachtigers style, but Couperus proved far more important and durable as a novelist and his earliest story, Eline Vere (1889) already took him out of the ranks of his contemporaries. In 1891 he published Noodlot, which was translated into English as "Footsteps of Fate" It was greatly admired by Oscar Wilde, whose The Picture of Dorian Gray is said to have been influenced by it. Couperus continued to pour out one important novel after another until his death in 1923. He separated himself, as he developed, from the more fanatical members of the Tachtigers group, and addressed himself to the wider public. Another talent for prose was revealed by Frederik van Eeden (1860–1932) in De kleine Johannes ("Little Johnny", 1887) and in Van de koele meren des doods ("From the Cold Pools of Death", 1901), a melancholy novel.

19th century
After 1887 the condition of modern Dutch literature remained comparatively stationary, and within the last decade of the 19th century was definitely declining. In 1889 a new poet, Herman Gorter (1864–1927) made his appearance with an epic poem called Mei ("May"), eccentric both in prosody and in treatment. He held his own without any marked advance towards lucidity or variety. Since the recognition of Gorter, however, no really remarkable talent has made itself prominent in Dutch poetry except P.C. Boutens (1870–1943), whose Verzen ("Verses") in 1898 were received with great respect.

Willem Kloos, still the acute and somewhat turbulent leader of the school, collected his poems in 1894 and his critical essays in 1896. The others, with the exception of Couperus, showed symptoms of sinking into silence. The entire school, now that the struggle for recognition was over, and its members were accepted as the mainstream, rested on its triumphs and soon limited itself to a repetition of its old experiments.

The leading dramatist at the close of the century was Herman Heijermans (1864–1924), a writer of strong realistic and socialistic tendencies who single-handedly brought Dutch theatre into the modern time.  His Ghetto (1898) and Ora et labora (1901) particularly display his peculiar talent, while his fishermen's tragedy Op hoop van zegen ("Trusting Our Fate in the Hands of God"), which is still staged and has been filmed more than once , remains his most popular play.

See also
 Flemish literature

Dutch literature
History of literature
19th-century books